The Göttingen Manifesto was a declaration of 18 leading nuclear scientists of West Germany (among them the Nobel laureates Otto Hahn, Max Born, Werner Heisenberg and Max von Laue) against arming the West German army with tactical nuclear weapons in the 1950s, the early part of the Cold War, as the West German government under chancellor Adenauer had suggested.

Historical situation
In the Second World War some of the signing scientists had been members of the Uranverein, a nuclear research project of the Nazi regime. The war ended with the nuclear destruction of the cities of Hiroshima and Nagasaki by the United States.

After World War II the Cold War began. In 1953 the hydrogen bomb was invented. A short time later both superpowers, the United States and the Soviet Union, had a so-called overkill potential. In the whole world and especially in the frontier states of the Cold War there was a great fear of nuclear war at that time. 

Germany was divided, and both German states were frontier states in the Cold War. In May 1955, West Germany became a sovereign nation and joined NATO.  It founded its own army, the Bundeswehr, in 1955. There were many protests against the remilitarisation of West Germany. In 1956 East Germany founded its own army, the Nationale Volksarmee (NVA).

Following the end of the Korean War, NATO's focus shifted to Europe. Through NATO, the United States deployed its first nuclear weapons in West Germany in March 1955.
This led to proposals for the development of similar capabilities for newly created West German army (Bundeswehr) in the course of the year 1956. Franz Josef Strauss, appointed Federal Minister of Nuclear Energy in 1955, and Defence Minister in 1956, was charged with building up the West German defence forces. 

Attempts by German nuclear physicists, including Otto Hahn and Carl Friedrich von Weizsäcker, to dissuade Germany politicians from nuclear expansion were felt to be unsuccessful. On April 5, 1957 chancellor Konrad Adenauer trivialized tactical nuclear weapons in a press release as “especially harmless weapons”.
The Göttingen Eighteen wrote the following manifesto on April 12, 1957.
Albert Schweitzer followed the Manifesto with his Declaration of Conscience speech, broadcast widely on 23 April 1957.

The Manifesto

German original text
The original text of the Manifesto, in German, is as follows:

References

Political manifestos
1957 in West Germany
Anti–nuclear weapons movement
Cold War history of Germany
Göttingen
1957 documents